DeAndre Scott Wright (born April 13, 1986) is an American football cornerback who is currently a free agent. He was drafted by the New York Giants in the sixth round of the 2009 NFL Draft. He played college football at New Mexico.

Wright has also been a member of the Detroit Lions, Minnesota Vikings and Cleveland Browns.he now coaches the stars defense

Professional career

New York Giants
Drafted by the Giants, Wright did not make it past final cuts for the 2009 season.

First stint with Vikings
Picked up as a free agent after failing to make the Giants, Wright was signed to the Vikings Practice Squad after the 2009 season got underway. Wright was released by the Vikings as part of final cuts on September 4, 2010 prior to the beginning of the 2010 NFL season.

Cleveland Browns
The Browns signed Wright to their practice squad before deleting him in the latter half of the 2010 season.

Second Stint With Vikings
Wright was once again signed to the Vikings Practice Squad late in the season due to the promotion of Marcus Sherels to make up for injuries in their secondary. Wright's practice team contract expired and was not renewed at the end of the 2010 season. DeAndre Wright is now an unrestricted free agent.

New Mexico Stars
Wright spent the 2012 through 2014 season on the New Mexico Stars of both the Indoor Football League and Lone Star Football League.

Return to Duke City
On January 1, 2017, Wright re-signed with the Duke City Gladiators. On March 1, 2017, Wright was released.

External links
Detroit Lions bio 
New Mexico Lobos bio

1986 births
Living people
American football cornerbacks
Cleveland Browns players
Detroit Lions players
Duke City Gladiators players
Minnesota Vikings players
New Mexico Lobos football players
New Mexico Stars players
New York Giants players
People from Prince George's County, Maryland
Players of American football from Maryland
Players of American football from Washington, D.C.
Sportspeople from the Washington metropolitan area